The Conciliatory Resolution was a resolution passed by the British Parliament in an attempt to reach a peaceful settlement with the Thirteen Colonies two months prior to the outbreak of the American Revolutionary War.

In January 1775, Parliament considered petitions from the colonies in relation to the Coercive Acts, including a petition to the king from the First Continental Congress, and discussed ways to resolve the crisis with the Thirteen Colonies. A proposal by William Pitt to recognize colonial self-government was rejected by the House of Lords. Pitt then moved for the withdrawal of troops from Boston, but that motion was defeated. In February, Pitt presented a plan of conciliation based upon mutual concessions, but this was also rejected. On February 2, despite fierce opposition from some members of Parliament, Massachusetts was declared to be in rebellion. Lord North took the unexpected (for him, that is) role of conciliator for the drafting of a conciliatory resolution which was proposed on February 20, 1775 and dated on February 27.

The Conciliatory Resolution declared that any colony that contributed to the common defense and provided support for the civil government and the administration of justice (ostensibly against any anti-Crown rebellion) would be relieved of paying taxes or duties except those necessary for the regulation of commerce.

The resolution was addressed and sent to the individual colonies, and intentionally ignored the extralegal Continental Congress. By doing this, Lord North hoped to divide the colonists amongst themselves and thus weaken any revolution/independence movements (especially those represented by the Continental Congress). The resolution proved to be "too little, too late," and the American Revolutionary War began at Lexington on April 19, 1775.

The Continental Congress representing the thirteen colonies rejected the proposal as an infringement on their exclusive right to raise revenue. In contrast, the loyal colony of Nova Scotia accepted it. Nova Scotia suggested raising the revenue by imposing a duty on foreign imports, this was granted by Parliament which then repealed all other taxes (except those related to commerce) on Nova Scotia.

Full text of the Resolution

Resolved, That it is the opinion of this Committee, that when the Governour, Council, and Assembly, or General Court, of any of his Majesty's Provinces or Colonies in America, shall propose to make provision, according to the condition, circumstances, and situation of such Province or Colony, for contributing their proportion to the common defence, (such proportion to be raised under the authority of the General Court, or General Assembly of such Province or Colony, and disposable by Parliament,) and shall engage to make provision also for the support of the Civil Government, and the Administration of Justice, in such Province or Colony, it will be proper if such proposal shall be approved by his Majesty and the two Houses of Parliament, and for so long as such provision shall be made accordingly, to forbear, in respect of such Province or Colony, to levy any Duty, Tax, or Assessment, or to impose any farther Duty, Tax, or Assessment, except only such Duties as it may be expedient to continue to levy or to impose for the regulation of commerce; the nett produce of the duties last mentioned to be carried to the account of such Province or Colony respectively.

Receipt and rejection by Congress

The Continental Congress did eventually receive the Conciliatory Resolution in the form of a communication from the assembly of New Jersey on May 26, 1775, and, perhaps for a number of reasons (not limited to the early successes of the Revolution), released a report (written by Benjamin Franklin, Thomas Jefferson, John Adams, and Richard Henry Lee in committee after they had finished with other papers including the declaration of causes, which explains the delay between the receipt of the Resolution and the release of the report on it), dated July 31, 1775, rejecting it:

The Congress took the said resolution into consideration, and are, thereupon, of opinion, That colonies of America are entitled to the sole and exclusive privilege of giving and granting their own money....To propose, therefore, as this resolution does, that the monies given by the colonies shall be subject to the disposal of parliament alone, is to, propose that they shall relinquish this right of enquiry, and put it in the power of others to render their gifts ruinous, in proportion as they are liberal....The proposition seems also to have been calculated more particularly to lull into fatal security, our well-affected fellow-subjects on the other side the water, till time should be given for the operation of those arms, which a British minister pronounced would instantaneously reduce the "cowardly" sons of America to unreserved submission. But, when the world reflects, how inadequate to justice are these vaunted terms; when it attends to the rapid and bold succession of injuries, which, during the course of eleven years, have been aimed at these colonies; when it reviews the pacific and respectful expostulations, which, during that whole time, were the sole arms we opposed to them; when it observes that our complaints were either not heard at all, or were answered with new and accumulated injuries; when it recollects that the minister himself, on an early occasion, declared, "that he would never treat with America, till he had brought her to his feet," and that an avowed partisan of ministry has more lately denounced against us the dreadful sentence, "delenda est Carthago;" that this was done in presence of a British Senate and being unreproved by them, must be taken to be their own sentiment, (especially as the purpose has already in part been carried into execution, by their treatment of Boston and burning of Charlestown;) when it considers the great armaments with which they have invaded us, and the circumstances of cruelty with which these have commenced and prosecuted hostilities; when these things, we say, are laid together and attentively considered, can the world be deceived into an opinion that we are unreasonable, or can it hesitate to believe with us, that nothing but our own exertions may defeat the ministerial sentence of death or abject submission.

References

1775 in Great Britain
1775 in the Thirteen Colonies
British laws relating to the American Revolution
Diplomacy during the American Revolutionary War
1775 in international relations
Parliament of Great Britain
Continental Congress